Neuville-sous-Montreuil (literally Neuville under Montreuil) is a commune in the Pas-de-Calais department in the Hauts-de-France region of France.

Geography
Neuville-sous-Montreuil is a suburb east of Montreuil-sur-Mer, on the D113 road, next to the N1 road.

Population

Places of interest
 The nineteenth century church of St.Vaast.
 The thirteenth century charterhouse of Notre-Dame-des-Prés. It was rebuilt in the 19th century.
 La Grange Blanche 1778, private studio/gallery of John Hutton, international abstract geometric artist.

See also
Communes of the Pas-de-Calais department

References

Neuvillesousmontreuil